The Red Lion Area School District is a large, suburban/rural, public school district located in southeastern York County, Pennsylvania that serves the boroughs of Felton, Red Lion, Windsor, and Winterstown; and the townships of Chanceford Township, Lower Chanceford Township, North Hopewell Township, and Windsor Township.

According to 2000 federal census data, it served a resident population of 32,661 people. By 2010, the district's population grew to 38,310 people, with 10% being ages 5–17 years.

History
In 2009, Red Lion Area School District residents' per capita income was $20,325, while the median family income was $51,051. In the Commonwealth, the median family income was $49,501 and the United States median family income was $49,445, in 2010.

Schools
Red Lion Area Senior High School
Red Lion Area Junior High School
Clearview Elementary School
Mazie Gable Elementary School
Locust Grove Elementary School
Pleasant View Elementary School
North Hopewell – Winterstown Elementary School
Windsor Manor Elementary School (Only Teaches Kindergarten as of 2018)
Larry J. Macaluso Elementary School

Extracurriculars
Red Lion Area School District's students have access to a variety of clubs, activities and an extensive sports program.

Sports
The District funds:

Boys
Baseball – AAAA
Basketball- AAAA
Cross Country – AAA
Football – AAAA
Golf – AAA
Indoor Track and Field – AAAA
Lacrosse – AAAA
Soccer – AAA
Swimming and Diving – AAA
Tennis – AAA
Track and Field – AAA
Volleyball – AAA
Wrestling – AAA

Girls
Basketball – AAAA
Cross Country – AAA
Indoor Track and Field AAAA
Field Hockey – AAA
Golf – AAA
Lacrosse – AAAA
Soccer (Fall) – AAA
Softball – AAAA
Swimming and Diving – AAA
Girls' Tennis – AAA
Track and Field – AAA
Volleyball – AAA
Unisex:
Marching Band

Junior High School Sports

Boys
Basketball
Cross Country
Football
Track and Field
Wrestling	

Girls
Basketball
Cross Country
Field Hockey
Lacrosse
Track and Field
Volleyball

According to PIAA directory July 2012

Notable alumni

Lzzy Hale (born 1983), lead singer and rhythm guitarist for the band Halestorm
Arejay Hale, younger brother of Lzzy Hale, drummer and backing vocalist for the band Halestorm
Butch Wynegar (born 1956), major league baseball player

See also
William Michael Stankewicz, who committed a machete attack on a kindergarten class in the district in 2001

References

External links
 Home page

Susquehanna Valley
School districts in York County, Pennsylvania